Barbera is a name shared by several wine and table grape varieties with the most notable being the red Barbera grape of Piedmont in northwest Italy. Other grapes which are known as Barbera, either as part of their primary name or as a synonym, include:

Barbera Amara
Barbera bianca
Barbera Ciaria
Barbera del Sannio
Barbera di Patrunat
Barbera Sarda
Barbera Selvatico
Durasa, known under the synonym of Barbera Rotonda
Ervi, crossing known under the synonym of Barbera x Bonarda 108 
Freisa, known under the synonym of Barbera
Sanches, Brazilian hybrid grape crossing known under the synonym of Barbera Min
Terzi 1, crossing known under the synonym of Barbera x Cabernet Franc N.1